David James Fitzpatrick (born 28 February 1990) is an English professional footballer who plays as a left back for  club Radcliffe.

He began his career playing semi-professional football for Northwich Victoria and New Mills in the Northern Premier League. He won the Cheshire Senior Cup with Northwich in 2011, scoring both goals in the final. He joined Southport in 2013 and established himself in the Conference Premier with 80 league appearances in two seasons, also winning three caps for the England C team. He signed with Macclesfield Town in September 2015 and soon established himself in the first-team, helping the club to reach the 2017 FA Trophy final. He played all 46 league games of the 2017–18 National League title winning campaign and made his debut in the English Football League the next season at the age of 28. He signed with Port Vale in August 2020 and moved on to Altrincham 12 months later. He signed with Chester in January 2022 and moved on to Radcliffe five months later.

Club career

Early career
Born in Manchester, Fitzpatrick started his career at Stockport County before joining Northern Premier League Premier Division side Northwich Victoria in November 2010. Having made over 30 appearances for the club over the course of the 2010–11 season, scoring five goals, he signed a new contract at the end of the season. He scored both of Northwich's goals in their 2–0 victory over Altrincham in the Cheshire Senior Cup final.

As a result of a lack of first-team action, Fitzpatrick was released by Victoria in October 2011 in order to join Northern Premier League Division One South side New Mills. Fitzpatrick made ten appearances for New Mills, scoring four goals, before rejoining Northwich Victoria on 23 December 2011. Northwich finished the 2011–12 season in second place but were actually relegated due to financial issues. In the summer of 2012, Fitzpatrick rejoined New Mills on a permanent basis. The "Millers" finished third in the 2012–13 campaign, but lost out to Trafford in the play-off semi-finals. Whilst playing in the Northern Premier League he also turned out for Altrincham Sunday League pub side Brookland's Tap and worked a full-time job in Human Resources for a claims company.

Southport
After an impressive season at New Mills, he joined Southport on 28 July 2013, who were managed by former Northwich manager Alan Wright. In Fitzpatrick's first season in the Conference Premier, he made 46 appearances and scored his only goal on the last day of the 2013–14 season, "a stunning 30-yard strike" in a 2–1 win over FC Halifax Town at Haig Avenue, won him the club's Goal of the Season award. His second season at the club saw him make 37 league appearances under three different managers: Martin Foyle, Gary Brabin and Paul Carden.

Macclesfield Town
Following trial periods at Crawley Town and Stevenage, Fitzpatrick joined Macclesfield Town in September 2015 on a four-month contract. In January 2016, his contract with the club was extended until the end of the season. After making 37 appearances for Macclesfield during the 2015–16 season, with Fitzpatrick praised for his performances, he signed a one-year contract extension at the end of the season. The 2016–17 campaign saw Fitzpatrick make 37 league appearances, whilst he also played in the 2017 FA Trophy final at Wembley Stadium, where Macclesfield lost 3–2 to York City. He signed another one-year contract extension in the summer. The 2017–18 season was another successful season for Fitzpatrick as he appeared in every one of Macclesfield's 46 league matches as the club finished top of the National League, and were promoted to League Two, with Fitzpatrick signing a new two-year contract with Macclesfield Town as a result. He was also named in the Non-League Paper's National League Team of the Season, alongside teammate Danny Whitaker and manager John Askey.

On 4 August 2018, he made his first appearance in the English Football League (EFL) in a 3–2 defeat to Swindon Town, before going on to make 40 appearances, scoring thrice in a season where Macclesfield would marginally survive relegation, finishing 22nd. The 2019–20 season saw Fitzpatrick make 21 appearances without scoring as Macclesfield would survive relation despite a points deduction as a result of Bury's expulsion from the Football League, with the "Silkmen" eventually finishing 23rd. Fitzpatrick accused the EFL of unfairly treating the club as they were deducted a total of 13 points, whilst the League Two campaign was ended early due to the COVID-19 pandemic in England. However on 11 August, the EFL won an appeal to an independent arbitration panel to deduct a further four points from Macclesfield, relegating the club into the National League and handing a reprieve to Stevenage. He was released at the end of the 2019–20 season.

Port Vale
On 25 August 2020, Fitzpatrick signed a one-year contract with Port Vale after impressing on trial. He said the decision to sign up was "a no-brainer really" as he previously worked well with former Macclesfield manager John Askey and players such as Danny Whitehead. He was one of 15 players that were released at the end of the 2020–21 season.

Altrincham
He went on to have a trial with Altrincham after manager Phil Parkinson faced an injury crisis in pre-season, with Andy White, Connor Hampson and Shaun Densmore all ruled out; Fitzpatrick was signed to a contract with the National League club on 1 August 2021. On 31 December 2021, Fitzpatrick departed the club at the end of his short-term contract following the return of the injured players whom he was brought in to cover.

Chester
On 6 January 2022, Fitzpatrick joined National League North side Chester on a deal until the end of the 2021–22 season; he had previously worked with manager Steve Watson at Macclesfield. His arrival led to the departure of previous incumbent left-back Josh Askew. He made 20 appearances to help the "Seals" to avoid relegation and Watson credited his experience as part of an improved defensive record at the Deva Stadium.

Radcliffe
On 27 June 2022, Fitzpatrick joined Northern Premier League Premier Division club Radcliffe.

International career
On 19 November 2013, Fitzpatrick made his debut for the England C team in a 2–2 draw with Czech Republic U21. He won further caps against Slovakia U23 and Hungary in May 2014.

Style of play
Fitzpatrick is a left-back with good composure who likes to play a simple game.

Personal life
Fitzpatrick worked in Human resources from 2010 to 2020.

Career statistics

Honours
Northwich Victoria
Cheshire Senior Cup: 2011

Macclesfield Town
FA Trophy runner-up: 2017
National League: 2017–18

References

1990 births
Living people
English footballers
Association football fullbacks
Stockport County F.C. players
Northwich Victoria F.C. players
New Mills A.F.C. players
Southport F.C. players
Macclesfield Town F.C. players
Port Vale F.C. players
Altrincham F.C. players
Chester F.C. players
Radcliffe F.C. players
Northern Premier League players
National League (English football) players
English Football League players
England semi-pro international footballers